Lollo is a surname. Notable people with the surname include:

Lorenzo Lollo (born 1990), Italian footballer
Luciano Lollo (born 1987), Argentine footballer
Mark Lollo (born 1982), American baseball umpire

See also
Cape Lollo